Pre-lamin A/C or lamin A/C is a protein that in humans is encoded by the LMNA gene. Lamin A/C belongs to the lamin family of proteins.

Function 

In the setting of ZMPSTE24 deficiency, the final step of lamin processing does not occur, resulting in an accumulation of farnesyl-prelamin A. In Hutchinson–Gilford progeria syndrome, a 50-amino acid deletion in prelamin A (amino acids 607–656) removes the site for the second endoproteolytic cleavage. Consequently, no mature lamin A is formed, and a farnesylated mutant prelamin A (progerin) accumulates in cells. The nuclear lamina consist of a two-dimensional matrix of proteins located next to the inner nuclear membrane. The lamin family of proteins make up the matrix and are highly conserved in evolution. During mitosis, the lamina matrix is reversibly disassembled as the lamin proteins are phosphorylated. Lamin proteins are thought to be involved in nuclear stability, chromatin structure and gene expression. Vertebrate lamins consist of two types, A and B. Through alternate splicing, this gene encodes three type A lamin isoforms.

Early in mitosis, maturation promoting factor (abbreviated MPF, also called mitosis-promoting factor or M-phase-promoting factor) phosphorylates specific serine residues in all three nuclear lamins, causing depolymerization of the lamin intermediate filaments. The phosphorylated lamin B dimers remain associated with the nuclear membrane via their isoprenyl anchor.  Lamin A is targeted to the nuclear membrane by an isoprenyl group but it is cleaved shortly after arriving at the membrane.  It stays associated with the membrane through protein-protein interactions of itself and other membrane associated proteins, such as TOR1AIP1 (LAP1).  Depolymerization of the nuclear lamins leads to disintegration of the nuclear envelope.  Transfection experiments demonstrate that phosphorylation of human lamin A is required for lamin depolymerization, and thus for disassembly of the nuclear envelope, which normally occurs early in mitosis.

Clinical significance 

Mutations in the LMNA gene are associated with several diseases, including Emery–Dreifuss muscular dystrophy, familial partial lipodystrophy, limb girdle muscular dystrophy, dilated cardiomyopathy, Charcot–Marie–Tooth disease, and restrictive dermopathy. A truncated version of lamin A, commonly known as progerin, causes Hutchinson-Gilford-Progeria syndrome. To date over 1,400 SNPs are known . They can manifest in changes on mRNA, splicing or protein (e.g. Arg471Cys, 
Arg482Gln, 
Arg527Leu, Arg527Cys, 
Ala529Val 
) level.

DNA damage

DNA double-strand damages can be repaired by either homologous recombination (HR) or non-homologous end joining (NHEJ).   LMNA promotes genetic stability by maintaining the levels of proteins that have key roles in HR and NHEJ.  Mouse cells that are deficient for maturation of prelamin A have increased DNA damage and chromosome aberrations, and show increased sensitivity to DNA damaging agents.  In progeria, the inadequacy of DNA repair, due to defective LMNA, may cause features of premature aging (see DNA damage theory of aging).

Interactions 

LMNA has been shown to interact with:

 ALOX12
 EMD
 NARF
 SREBF1
 TMPO
 ZNF239
 SIRT1

References

Further reading

External links 
 
 
 
 LOVD mutation database: LMNA
 GeneCards for LMNA
Laminopathy Information Site for Lay Public

Genes on human chromosome 1
Aging-related genes
Aging-related proteins